Polynomial matrices are widely studied in the fields of systems theory and control theory and have seen other uses relating to stable polynomials. In stability theory, Spectral Factorization has been used to find determinantal matrix representations for bivariate stable polynomials and real zero polynomials. A key tool used to study these is a matrix factorization known as either the Polynomial Matrix Spectral Factorization or the Matrix Fejer–Riesz Theorem.

Given a univariate positive polynomial , a polynomial which takes on non-negative values for any real input , the Fejer–Riesz Theorem yields the polynomial spectral factorization . Results of this form are generically referred to as Positivstellensatz. Considering positive definiteness as the matrix analogue of positivity, Polynomial Matrix Spectral Factorization provides a similar factorization for polynomial matrices which have positive definite range. This decomposition also relates to the Cholesky decomposition for scalar matrices . This result was originally proven by Wiener in a more general context which was concerned with integrable matrix-valued functions that also had integrable log determinant. Because applications are often concerned with the polynomial restriction, simpler proofs and individual analysis exist focusing on this case. Weaker positivstellensatz conditions have been studied, specifically considering when the polynomial matrix has positive definite image on semi-algebraic subsets of the reals. Many publications recently have focused on streamlining proofs for these related results. This article roughly follows the recent proof method of Lasha Ephremidze which relies only on elementary linear algebra and complex analysis.

Spectral Factorization is used extensively in linear–quadratic–Gaussian control. Because of this application there have been many algorithms to calculate spectral factors. Some modern algorithms focus on the more general setting originally studied by Wiener. In the  case the problem is known as polynomial spectral factorization, or Fejer-Riesz Theorem, and has many classical algorithms. Some modern algorithms have used Toeplitz matrix advances to speed up factor calculations.

Statement 
Let be a polynomial matrix where each entry  is a complex coefficient polynomial of degree at most . Suppose that for almost all  we have  is a positive definite hermitian matrix. Then there exists a polynomial matrix  such that  for all . We can furthermore find  which is nonsingular on the lower half plane.

Extension to complex inputs 
Note that if then . When  is a complex coefficient polynomial or complex coefficient rational function we have is also a polynomial or rational function respectively. We can conclude they in fact agree for all complex inputs.

Rational spectral factorization 
Let  be a rational polynomial function where  for almost all . Then there exists rational  with  where  has no poles or zeroes in the lower half plane. This decomposition is unique up to multiplication by complex scalars of norm . This is related to the statement of the Polynomial Matrix Spectral Factorization theorem restricted to the  case.

To prove existence write where . Letting , we can conclude that  is real and positive. Dividing out by  we reduce to the monic case. The numerator and denominator have distinct sets of roots, so all real roots which show up in either must have even multiplicity (to prevent a sign change locally). We can divide out these real roots to reduce to the case where  has only complex roots and poles. By hypothesis we have . Since all of the are complex (and hence not fixed points of conjugation) they both come in conjugate pairs. For each conjugate pair, pick the zero or pole in the upper half plane and accumulate these to obtain . The uniqueness result follows in a standard fashion.

Cholesky decomposition 
The inspiration for this result is a factorization which characterizes positive definite matrices.

Decomposition for scalar matrices 
Given any positive definite scalar matrix , the Cholesky decomposition allows us to write  where  is a lower triangular matrix. If we don't restrict to lower triangular matrices we can consider all factorizations of the form . It is not hard to check that all factorizations are achieved by looking at the orbit of  under right multiplication by a unitary matrix, .

To obtain the lower triangular decomposition we induct by splitting off the first row and first column:Solving these in terms of  we get

Since  is positive definite we have is a positive real number, so it has a square root.

Decomposition for rational matrices 
Then by the symmetric Gaussian elimination we performed above, all we need to show is there exists a rational  such that for real , which follows from our rational spectral factorization.

It is not hard to check that we in fact get where  is a rational polynomial matrix with no poles in the lower half plane.

Extension to polynomial decompositions 
To prove the existence of polynomial matrix spectral factorization, we begin with the rational polynomial matrix Cholesky Decomposition and modify it to remove lower half plane singularities. Namely given  with each entry  a complex coefficient polynomial we have rational polynomial matrix  with for real , where  has no lower half plane poles. Given a rational polynomial matrix  which is unitary valued for real , there exists another decomposition,.

Removing lower half-plane singularities 
If  then there exists a scalar unitary matrix such that . To remove the singularity at  we multiply byhas determinant with one less zero (by multiplicity) at a, without introducing any poles in the lower half plane of any of the entries.

Extend analyticity to all of C 
After modifications, the decomposition satisfies  is analytic and invertible on the lower half plane. To extend analyticity to the upper half plane we need this key observation: Given a rational matrix  who is analytic in the lower half plane and nonsingular in the lower half plane, we have  is analytic and nonsingular in the lower half plane. The nonsingularity follows from which can only have zeroes at places where  had poles. The determinant of a rational polynomial matrix can only have poles where its entries have poles, so  has no poles in the lower half plane.

From our observation in Extension to Complex Inputs, we have for all complex numbers. This implies . Since  is analytic on the lower half plane,  is analytic on the upper half plane. Finally if  has a pole on the real line then has the same pole on the real line which contradicts the fact  has no poles on the real line (it is analytic everywhere by hypothesis).

The above shows that if  is analytic and invertible on the lower half plane indeed  is analytic everywhere and hence a polynomial matrix.

Uniqueness 
Since  is analytic on the lower half plane and nonsingular, is a rational polynomial matrix which is analytic and invertible on the lower half plane. Then by the same argument as above we have  is in fact a polynomial matrix which is unitary for all real . This means that if  is the th row of then . For real  this is a sum of non-negative polynomials which sums to a constant, implying each of the summands are in fact constant polynomials. Then where  is a scalar unitary matrix.

Example 
Consider . Then through symmetric Gaussian elimination we get the rational decomposition . This decomposition has no poles in the upper half plane. Consider . Then we have a new candidate for our decomposition. Now the first column vanishes at

This is our desired decomposition  with no singularities in the lower half plane.

See also
Matrix factorization of a polynomial

References 

Matrix decompositions
Polynomials